UFC Fight Night: Jędrzejczyk vs. Penne (also known as UFC Fight Night 69) was a mixed martial arts event held on June 20, 2015, at O2 World in Berlin, Germany.

Background
The event was expected to be headlined by a light heavyweight bout between former title challengers Alexander Gustafsson and Glover Teixeira. However, Gustafsson pulled out of the bout on May 1 due to an injury. In turn, Teixeira was removed from the card entirely and was rescheduled to face Ovince Saint Preux on August 8, 2015, at UFC Fight Night 73. Subsequently, a UFC Women's Strawweight Championship bout between current champion Joanna Jędrzejczyk and former Invicta FC Atomweight champion Jessica Penne was announced as the new event headliner.

Makwan Amirkhani was expected to face Diego Rivas at the event. However, shortly after the bout was announced, Rivas was pulled from the fight due to undisclosed reasons. Amirkhani remained on the card to face Masio Fullen.

A welterweight bout between Sérgio Moraes and Peter Sobotta was originally booked for UFC Fight Night 64. However, the bout was cancelled due to Sobotta being injured. Moraes remained on the card against a different opponent. The fight was later rescheduled for this event. On June 9, the fight was scrapped once again as Moraes pulled out for undisclosed reasons. He was replaced by promotional newcomer Steve Kennedy.

A light heavyweight bout between Nikita Krylov and Marcos Rogério de Lima was briefly linked to this event. However the pairing was moved a week later to UFC Fight Night 70.

Derek Brunson was expected to face Krzysztof Jotko at the event. However, Brunson pulled out of the fight on June 9 citing a rib injury and was briefly replaced by Uriah Hall. Three days after the booking, Hall was removed due to an alleged visa issue. In turn, Jotko was removed from the card entirely.

Mike Wilkinson was expected to face Alan Omer at the event. However, Wilkinson suffered a shoulder injury and was removed from the card. Wilkinson was replaced by promotional newcomer Arnold Allen.

Results

Bonus awards
The following fighters were awarded $50,000 bonuses:
Fight of the Night: Joanna Jędrzejczyk vs. Jessica Penne
Performance of the Night: Mairbek Taisumov and Arnold Allen

See also
List of UFC events
2015 in UFC

References

UFC Fight Night
Events in Berlin
Mixed martial arts in Germany
2015 in German sport
Sports competitions in Berlin
2015 in mixed martial arts
June 2015 sports events in Europe